Non-human electoral candidates have been found in a number of countries. Often, the candidacies are a means of casting a protest vote or satirizing the political system. At other times it is simply done for entertainment value.

Electoral regulations may explicitly require candidates to be human (or equivalent wording), or they may require candidates to do things which animals cannot reasonably do (such as sign their names legibly on legal forms); most constituencies require candidates to be of the age of a legal adult, which eliminates many animals whose life expectancies usually make them too young to ever qualify. On some occasions, however, animals have been accepted as candidates, and they have even won office.

Notable examples

Elected to office

 In 1922, Ioiô ("Yo-yo"), a billy goat, was elected city councilor of Fortaleza, Ceará, Brazil.
 in 1938 Kenneth Simmons entered Boston Curtis, a brown mule, as a candidate for a Republican precinct seat in Milton, Washington, in 1938, winning 51 to zero. Simmons stated that he had done this to demonstrate that many people vote without considering who they are actually voting for. 
 In 1967, an Ecuadorian foot powder company advertised its product, Pulvapies, as a mayoral candidate in the town of Picoazá. Surprisingly, the foot powder won by a clear majority.
 Lajitas, Texas, held an election that included candidates Tommy Steele (incumbent human mayor), a trading-post wooden Indian, a dog named Buster, and a goat named Clay Henry.  The goat won "by a landslide", and goats have been mayors ever since.
 Bosco the dog, a black Labrador-Rottweiler mix, was elected mayor of Sunol, California (1981–1994).
 All elected mayors of Rabbit Hash, Kentucky, (unofficial ) have been dogs. 
 In 1997, a cat named Stubbs was elected mayor of Talkeetna, Alaska.  Although his title as mayor was honorary, he was featured as a write-in candidate for the 2014 U.S. Senate race in Alaska.
 In 2012, the town of Idyllwild, California, elected a Golden Retriever named Max as mayor for life. Mayor Max I was succeeded by Mayor Max II upon his death, in 2013.
 In August 2014, seven-year-old Duke the Dog won an election and became the new mayor of Cormorant, Minnesota.
 In July 2018, a cat named Sweet Tart was elected mayor of Omena, Michigan.
 In March 2019, a 3-year-old Nubian goat named Lincoln was elected mayor of Fair Haven, Vermont, defeating a Samoyed dog named Sammie by two votes.
In February 2020 a Bernese Mountain Dog was voted the Honorary Mayor of Georgetown, Colorado.
In March 2023 a 3-legged cat named Joey was voted the Honorary Mayor of Columbia Heights, Minnesota

Candidates

 Cacareco, a rhinoceros at the São Paulo zoo, was a candidate for the 1958 city council elections with the intention of protesting against political corruption. Electoral officials did not accept Cacareco's candidacy, but she eventually won 100,000 votes, more than any other party in that same election (which was also marked by rampant absenteeism).  Today, the term voto Cacareco (Cacareco vote) is commonly used to describe protest votes in Brazil. Cacareco's candidacy inspired the Rhinoceros Party of Canada, nominally led by the rhinoceros Cornelius the First.
Pigasus the Immortal was a boar hog that the Yippies nominated as a candidate in the 1968 U.S. presidential election.
 A cat named Morris was a candidate for mayor of Xalapa, Mexico, in 2013.
 In 1989, regional council boundaries were redrawn in New Zealand, with an emphasis on catchments being connected. These revised maps made Whangamomona part of the Manawatu-Whanganui Region. Residents wanted to continue to be part of the Taranaki Region, and on 1 November 1989, they responded by declaring themselves the "Republic of Whangamomona" at the first Republic Day. At every Republic Day, they vote to either keep the seating President or to vote in a new one. Since 1999, they have had Billy Gumboot the Goat (1999–2001) and Tai the Poodle (2003–2004), the latest being Murt "Murtle the Turtle" Kennard (2005–2015).
 In 1987, Silvio, a chimpanzee from Córdoba, Argentina, was put as a provincial deputy candidate.
 Tião, a bad-tempered chimpanzee, was put forward by the fictional Brazilian Banana Party (Partido Bananista Brasileiro, actually the satirical group Casseta & Planeta) as a candidate for the Rio de Janeiro mayoralty in 1988. The campaign's slogan was "Vote monkey – get monkey" (because people were tired of voting for one platform and then seeing the elected officials implementing another one). There is no official counting, because all votes were recorded as "null", but it's estimated that Tião received over 400,000 votes, coming third.
 New Zealand's McGillicuddy Serious Party entered a goat in a local Waiheke Island election, but their attempt to have a hedgehog stand for Parliament was unsuccessful.
 Dustin the Turkey, a popular Irish television puppet received thousands of votes in the Republic of Ireland's 1997 presidential election. Although not being an official candidate there are rumours that he came in fifth, ahead of official candidate Derek Nally.
 In 2001, a Dachshund called Saucisse (Sausage) was a candidate for municipal elections in Marseille, France. He won 4% of the vote. Eight years later, in 2009, he participated in the third season of Secret Story, the French version of Big Brother. He entered the house on Day 36. His secret is that he was a candidate in the Marseille mayoral race. To protect his secret, he entered the house with the nickname "Secret".
 Molly the Dog, a dachshund from Oklahoma, named as a candidate in the 2008 U.S. presidential election.
 United States TV host and California councilmember Charlotte Laws had a chicken named Mae Poulet who ran for Vice President on the Bully ticket in the 2012 election.
 Hank the Cat, a Maine Coon from Northern Virginia, ran against Tim Kaine and George Allen for Virginia's Senate seat in 2012.  He earned third place in the state, with nearly 7,000 votes.
 Tuxedo Stan, a cat from Halifax, Nova Scotia, Canada, was a mayoral candidate in the 2012 municipal elections representing the Tuxedo Party, a political movement aimed to improve the welfare of felines in the Halifax Regional Municipality, "because neglect isn't working". He has been endorsed by celebrities including Anderson Cooper.
 A fire hydrant ran for election multiple times 2004–2008 at the University of British Columbia, including a position on the Board of Governors, coming within 6% of being elected.

Write-ins
 The Inanimate Objects Party at Rensselaer Polytechnic Institute encourages write-in votes for inanimate objects, such as an inflatable whale named Arthur Galpin or a dead albino squirrel.

Attempted or withdrawn candidates
Those that were not on the ballot, in chronological order.
 Incitatus, the favorite horse of Roman emperor Caligula (reigned 37–41 AD), is said to have been nominated for consul.
 Nobody for President was a parodic campaign for president of the U.S. presidential election of 1976, First nominated by Wavy Gravy outside of the Republican National Convention of 1976 in Kansas City, again as the Yippies' nominee.
 Colossus the Gorilla, the main attraction at Benson's Wild Animal Farm in Hudson, New Hampshire, failed to be put on the ballot in the 1980 New Hampshire Republican Presidential primary. The simian's candidacy was promoted by Benson's, but the zoo's argument that the U.S. Constitution does not specify that a native-born candidate for the presidency had to be human was rejected.

 Campaigns for fictional elder horror Cthulhu for President have been produced for all United States presidential elections since 1996, as well as for elections in Spain and Poland. 
 United States film maker Michael Moore attempted to get a potted ficus tree onto the ballot as a candidate for United States Representative in 2000.
 In 2006, a famous prankster and street artist from Szeged, Hungary, proclaimed himself the founder of the Hungarian Double-tailed Dog Party, going as far as to place propaganda ads out on the walls of Szeged's houses, promoting the candidate "István Nagy", a two-tailed dog.
 Ed the Sock, a sock puppet, attempted to run for the Fed-Up Party during the 2011 Canadian federal election.
 Giggles the Pig was set to run for mayor of Flint, Michigan, in 2015. Lawyer Michael Ewing started "Giggles the Pig for Flint Mayor" as a write-in campaign after a city clerk's office error threatened to keep all candidates' names off the August, 2015 mayoral primary election.  Ewing said the candidacy "sought to draw more attention to the mayoral race, better educate voters about their choices and encourage residents to demand more of elected officials."  Giggles attracted many online fans, while the "other candidates for mayor were less amused."  The write-in campaign was cancelled after state officials fixed the mistake and allowed four candidates' names to appear on the ballot, and the race had become "No longer an even playing field" for Giggles.  Giggles' Facebook page was then to be used to share good news stories about Flint.
 Limberbutt McCubbins, a male cat from Kentucky, was registered with the Federal Election Commission as a Democratic candidate for the 2016 United States presidential election. It was brought to national attention by The Rachel Maddow Show and the cat's candidacy was endorsed by Jezebel. Politifact rated the legitimacy of Limberbutt McCubbins' candidacy as "half true", noting that the FEC did not formally consider the cat a candidate because he hadn't spent or received $5,000. Emilee McCubbins, who owns the cat, and Isaac Weiss, who came up with the idea, said they wanted to encourage reform of the FEC, stating that it only took "20 minutes" to register as a candidate, and that they did not even require a social security number. They also wanted to encourage voter registration, particularly young voters.
 Crawfish B. Crawfish is a crawfish from Louisiana. Crawfish's campaign for the United States presidency began on Facebook on a page titled "Can This Crawfish Get More Supporters Than Bobby Jindal?", created on May 31, 2015. The campaign began to receive media attention after Louisiana governor Bobby Jindal announced his bid for the 2016 Presidential race. After Jindal's announcement, Crawfish received media attention from outlets such as The Huffington Post, Salon magazine, Bustle, and popular Louisiana-based publications NOLA Defender and Gambit. Crawfish officially registered with the Federal Election Commission, running for a non-listed party, on July 2, 2015. Crawfish has stated his support of education, gender equality, same-sex marriage, and Game of Thrones, while criticizing the strict bi-partisan system.

Other non-elected posts
 Catmando, a political cat, served as joint leader of Britain's Official Monster Raving Loony Party (OMRLP) from 1999 to 2002, along with his owner, Howling Laud Hope.

Folklore and pop culture
The notion of animals being elected to office has often been the subject of parody and folklore.

Thomas Love Peacock's 1817 novel Melincourt featured an orangutan as a parliamentary candidate.

In 1976, Marvel Comics announced that their character Howard the Duck would run in that year's election for the U.S. presidency.

Rita Mae Brown's detective cat Mrs. Murphy ran for President in the 2012 mystery novel Sneakie Pie for President.

The 2013 Black Mirror episode "The Waldo Moment" explores the concept of a cartoon character electoral candidate. Several news reports, including one by Chris Cillizza, political reporter for The Washington Post, compared the 2016 Donald Trump political campaign to the episode; later, in September 2016, episode writer Charlie Brooker also compared the Trump campaign to The Waldo Moment and predicted Trump would win the 2016 election.

The nerd-folk song "President Snakes" from the 2015 album of the same name by the music duo The Doubleclicks explores how five snakes run as one electoral candidate.

See also
 List of animals awarded human credentials
 List of frivolous political parties
 List of practical joke topics
 Jedi census phenomenon
 Incitatus

References

Animals in politics
Elections
Political satire
Practical jokes
Protest tactics